In architecture, light reflectance value (LRV), is a measure of visible and usable light that is reflected from a surface when illuminated by a light source.  The measurement is most commonly used by design professionals, such as architectural color consultants, architects, environmental graphic designers and interior designers.

LRVs are frequently reported on paint chips or paint samples. The values are used by lighting designers to determine the number and type of light fixtures needed to provide proper lighting for interior spaces.

Guidance
Designers of buildings must comply with the building codes applicable to the structure under consideration.  Since 2004 guidance has existed on access to and use of buildings.  The guidance is particularly concerned with provisions to assist the disabled, including those who are visually impaired. The guidance highlights the need for certain surfaces and features to contrast visually with their surroundings.  Areas of particular interest are wall-to-ceiling and wall-to-floor junctions, exposed edges of sloping floors, seating and its surroundings, leading edges of doors, door opening furniture and door surfaces, sanitary fittings and grab bars.

This is relevant to a wide range of non-residential buildings, such as hospitals, schools, hotels, and theatres.

Codes of practice
Color contrast may be determined by the formula [(B1 − B2) / B1] × 100, where B1 is the LRV of the lighter area, and B2 is the LRV of a darker area 

The British Standards Institute's guidance in the Regulations and in the relevant Codes of Practice, BS 8300:2018, is that adequate visual contrast is provided if the light reflectance values of the contrasting areas differ by at least thirty points.  The current British Standard for the measurement of LRV is BS8493:2008+A1:2010.

The Americans with Disabilities Act Standards for Accessible Design does not recommend a light reflectance value for contrast on signage with words or pictograms, but instead it provides that "characters shall contrast with their background with either light characters on a dark background or dark characters on a light background" in § 703.5.1 

The International Code Council utilizes the ADA approach and does not use a light reflectance value in the 2017 update to the standards for ICC A117.1 in § 703.5.3.2 

The United Nations Economic Commission for Europe uses a difference of sixty points between the LRVs for the contrast requirement of signage in "Railway Applications — Design for PRM Use - General Requirements — Part 1: Contrast."

Manufacturers are advised by the Guild of Architectural Ironmongery to publish the LRV for their products.

References

 Bradshaw, Vaugh, P.E. Building Control Systems. New York: John Wiley & Sons, Inc. Second Edition, 1993.

External links
LRV - What is it?  How is it used?
 Measurement: http://www.lucideon.com/industries/construction/building-products/light-reflectance-value-testing

Interior design
Color appearance phenomena
Lighting designers